Apremont is a commune in the department of Ain in the Auvergne-Rhône-Alpes region of eastern France.

Geography
Apremont is located halfway between Nantua and Oyonnax some 20 km north-west of Bellegarde-sur-Valserine and 40 km east of Bourg-en-Bresse.  The commune has an area of 1456 hectares and is bounded by the communes of Bellignat, Oyonnax, Charix, Nantua, Montreal-la-Cluse, Martignat, and Groissiat. The commune is composed of several villages including:
Petit Vallon
Grand Vallon
La Gotette
Ablatrix

There are also a few isolated farms such as Les Éterres, le Cree, and Molet.

The commune can be accessed by road D74 from Oyonnax in the north passing through the heart of the commune and the village and continuing to Nantua in the south. There is also access via the D95 from Charix in the south-west to the town. There are also several small roads in the commune. The commune consists of forest and mountain landscape.

The Lange river rises in the town and flows north to Oyonnax before turning south and joining the Oignin at Le Mollard.

Administration

List of Successive Mayors of Apremont

Population

Sights
 Ruins of a castle built in the 13th century

See also
 Communes of the Ain department

External links
Apremont on Géoportail, National Geographic Institute (IGN) website 
Apremont on the 1750 Cassini Map

References

Communes of Ain